Han Mahmud (Khan Mahmud) was a 19th-century Kurdish Lord.

He was born in Müküs (now in Van, Turkey), and after his father Abdi Beg's death, he became Mir of the Kurdish Emirate of Müküs

In 1843 and 1846 he fought within an alliance with Bedir Khan Beg from Cizre Botan from and Nurullah Beg from Hakkari against the christian Nestorians. The massacres caused by the alliance, raised concerns around the foreign christian missionaries and later were harshly criticized by diplomats from Europe and the United States. The Ottomans then tried to compel the alliance to surrender but the Ottomans were not persuasive enough. The Ottomans then fought the Kurdish alliance and Han Mahmoud lost his post in 1946 and was exiled to Rousse (now a Bulgarian city). Han Mahmud died in Rousse in 1866.

References 

History of the Kurdish people
1866 deaths
Year of birth unknown
Kurdish rulers
19th-century Kurdish people